Haplochromis sauvagei is a species of cichlid endemic to Lake Victoria. This species reaches a length of  SL. Its specific name honours the French paleontologist and ichthyologist Henri Émile Sauvage (1842-1917).

References

sauvagei
Fish described in 1896
Fish of Lake Victoria
Taxonomy articles created by Polbot